Chow's Gymnastics and Dance Institute, commonly referred to as Chow's, is an American women's artistic gymnastics academy based in West Des Moines, Iowa. The academy was founded by Chinese former artistic gymnast Liang Chow. One of the country's most prestigious gymnastics academies, the club has produced Olympic champions, Shawn Johnson and Gabrielle Douglas, and several upcoming elites such as Norah Flatley and Rachel Gowey.

History

1998–04: Foundations and the inception of Shawn Johnson 
Chow's was opened on August 23, 1998 by former Chinese national gymnast and Iowa Hawkeyes assistant coach, Liang Chow and his wife, Liwen Zhuang.

In 2004, Level 10 protegee, Shawn Johnson, finished fourth at the 2004 J.O. Nationals. As a result, she is the first Chow gymnast to make the J.O. National Team.

2005–07: Level 10 progression and the National rise of Shawn Johnson 
At the 2005 Level 9 Eastern Championships, Chow's was represented 3 times. Jessa Hansen won two individual medals also. Although Chow's didn't have any participants at the 2005 Level 10 J.O. Nationals, Shawn Johnson qualified to Junior International Elite status; the first of any Chow gymnast. In her first competition as an elite, the 2005 U.S. Classic, she finished third in the all-around.

As a result, she qualified to U.S. Nationals. At the competition, Johnson finished tenth in the all-around. Her result at the competition was enough to be named to the Junior Natitonal Team – the first of any Chow gymnast. Now a National Team member, she was invited to represent the United States at the 2006 Pacific Alliance Championships, held in Honolulu, Hawaii. She won the individual all-around competition, storming to  win of just under a whole mark difference.

Notable Gymnasts and Alumni 

Shawn Johnson:
 2008 Olympic balance beam champion and team, all-around, and floor exercise silver medalist
 2007 World team, all-around, and floor exercise champion
 2007 Pan American Games team, all-around, uneven bars, and balance beam champion, floor exercise silver medalist
 2011 Pan American Games team champion and uneven bars silver medalist
 2007 American Cup Champion; 2008 silver medalist
 2007 Longines Prize for Elegance recipient

Gabby Douglas:
 2012 Olympic team and all-around champion
 2016 Olympic team champion
 2011 World team champion
 2015 World team champion and all-around silver medalist
 2012 Pacific Rim team and uneven bars champion
 2010 Pan American team and uneven bars champion
 2016 American Cup champion

Norah Flatley: 
 2014 Pacific Rim junior team and balance beam champion
 2019 NCAA Championships team bronze medalist
 UCLA Bruins gymnastics

Rachel Gowey:
 2015 Pan American Games team and uneven bars champion
 2018 NCAA Championships team bronze medalist
 Florida Gators gymnastics

References

Gymnastics academies in the United States